Simon Beaumont (born 13 December 1975) is a former Australian rules footballer who played for Carlton and Hawthorn in the Australian Football League (AFL).

Carlton secured the services of Beaumont with the 18th pick in the 1993 AFL Draft. A left footer, Beaumont was used mainly as a half back flanker and later key defender but could also play forward which was demonstrated in a game for Carlton against Collingwood at the Melbourne Cricket Ground in Round 17, 1999 when he kicked eight goals, all of them in the first half. He is also a member of an exclusive group of players who kicked a goal with their first kick in the AFL, which he managed against Hawthorn in 1995.

Beaumont played 133 consecutive games for the club between Round 9 1998 and Round 22 2003. He became the first Carlton player to play 100 games in the #29 guernsey, thereby becoming the first name on the #29 locker in the Carlton changerooms (he has since been joined by Heath Scotland).

Beaumont was traded to Hawthorn at the end of the 2003 season. He increased his streak of consecutive games played to 144 before being suspended in the "Line in the Sand Game" for striking former Carlton teammate Justin Murphy. Beaumont spent two years at Hawthorn, playing 27 games in all, before retiring.

References

External links

Blueseum profile

1975 births
Living people
Carlton Football Club players
Hawthorn Football Club players
People educated at Melbourne Grammar School
Australian rules footballers from Victoria (Australia)
Sandringham Dragons players